Hitachi City Ikenokawa Sakura Arena is an arena in Hitachi, Ibaraki, Japan.

References

External links
Hitachi City Ikenokawa Sakura Arena
Hitachi City Ikenokawa Sakura Arena
Presentation video

Basketball venues in Japan
Cyberdyne Ibaraki Robots
Indoor arenas in Japan
Sports venues in Ibaraki Prefecture